Tara Institute is a Tibetan Buddhist center located in the suburb of East Brighton in Melbourne which provides Buddhist teachings throughout the year. As of March 2020 the lama, Venerable Geshe Doga has been the resident teacher at the centre since 1984. The Center is a member of the FPMT.

The location is 3 Mavis Ave, Brighton East VIC 3187.

History 
Tara House, the forerunner of Tara Institute had its beginnings in Melbourne in 1974 when a small group of people who had attended one of the first Kopan Monastery meditation courses in Nepal began to meet at a house in North Fitzroy. Then in 1976 the group rented an old hotel in Carlton which was named Tara House by Lama Thubten Yeshe. In 1977 the center moved to a rented house in Kew and began to develop a retreat centre at Noojee in 1978. The first resident teacher, Geshe Dawö arrived in 1980 with his translator, Kelsang Tsering.

Following the advice and persuasion of Lama Thubten Yeshe in 1981 to "think big" Tara House bought an old mansion in East St Kilda in 1983. By 1987 this location had become too small and so the current building at Marillac House, which incorporates an historic mansion, was purchased. The centre was then renamed Tara Institute.

Activities and facilities 
There is a weekly program of meditation and Buddhist courses plus weekend courses, pujas, special healing courses, social events and activities for children.

The Center has full-time residents as well as providing dormitory accommodation for visitors. It is supported through residency, membership fees, donations and volunteer work. Amongst the facilities are a library and a bookshop.

See also 
 Foundation for the Preservation of the Mahayana Tradition

References

External links 
 Official Website

Buddhist organisations based in Australia
Culture of Melbourne
Foundation for the Preservation of the Mahayana Tradition
Buddhist temples in Australia